This species was described in 2012. Individuals were previously placed in the P. fuscatus-group (Polistes fuscatus, Polistes metricus, Polistes bellicosus). Diagnostic information can be found in the Identification Atlas of the Vespidae of the Northeastern Nearctic Region as "species A". It appears in the NCBI taxonomy as [Polistes sp. Buck1.

This species is believed to be an obligate parasite of other social wasps, but no documented observations of this behavior have been made.

References

External links
 Bugguide
 Identification Atlas of the Vespidae (Hymenoptera, Aculeata) of the northeastern Nearctic region

hirsuticornis
Insects described in 2012
Hymenoptera of North America